Luuka Jones (born 18 October 1988) is a New Zealand slalom canoeist who has competed at the international level since 2006.

Early life
Jones was born in Tauranga in 1988. Her mother Denise Jones was a fan of the British actress Audrey Hepburn and Luuka Jones was named after Hepburn's second son, Luca Dotti. Her father is Rod Jones and she has three sisters. She was brought up adjacent to the Wairoa River. She took up kayaking at age ten and received lessons from Waimarino Adventure Park nearby. She went to Otumoetai Intermediate where in Year Seven, she set her goal to win an Olympic medal.

Canoeing career
Jones started competing in 2003 at age 14. In preparation for the 2008 Summer Olympics, she moved to England to train with the British team. She was the first female canoe slalom paddler to represent New Zealand at the Olympic Games.

She competed in the K1 event at the 2008 Beijing Olympics where she finished last in 21st position, thus being eliminated in the heats. At the 2012 Summer Olympics in London she qualified for the semi-finals of the K1 event where she finished in 14th place. At the 2016 Summer Olympics in Rio de Janeiro she won a silver medal in the K1 event. Jones recorded her 4th Olympic participation at the 2020 Summer Olympics in Tokyo where she started in both women's events. She finished 6th in the final of the K1 event and 13th in the C1 event after being eliminated in the semifinal.

Jones won a bronze medal in the K1 event at the 2019 ICF Canoe Slalom World Championships in La Seu d'Urgell.

World Cup individual podiums

1 Oceania Championship counting for World Cup points

Personal life
Jones moved to England at age 17 to further her canoe career and divides her time between Nottingham and New Zealand, spending the Northern Hemisphere based in Europe where most of the competitions are held. She studies business extramurally at Massey University, majoring in communication. She receives sponsorship from businesses based in Tauranga. Apart from canoe, Jones enjoys surfing, mountain biking and making sushi.

References

External links

1988 births
Living people
New Zealand female canoeists
Olympic canoeists of New Zealand
Canoeists at the 2008 Summer Olympics
Canoeists at the 2012 Summer Olympics
Canoeists at the 2016 Summer Olympics
Olympic silver medalists for New Zealand
Olympic medalists in canoeing
Medalists at the 2016 Summer Olympics
Sportspeople from Tauranga
Sportspeople from Nottingham
Medalists at the ICF Canoe Slalom World Championships
Canoeists at the 2020 Summer Olympics